Ross Township is one of 14 townships in Clinton County, Indiana. As of the 2010 census, its population was 2,898 and it contained 1,119 housing units.  The township was named for John Ross, a pioneer settler and associate county judge.

History
Ross was one of Clinton County's original townships created on May 15, 1830.  Solomon Miller—who arrived in March 1828—was its first settler.  According to a 1913 county history, a considerable number of the township's early settlers were Pennsylvania Germans and Dunkards.

Geography

Cities and towns
 Rossville

Unincorporated towns
 Edna Mills
 Mattix Corner
(This list is based on USGS data and may include former settlements.)

Adjacent townships
 Clay Township, Carroll County (north)
 Democrat Township, Carroll County (northeast)
 Owen Township (east)
 Union Township (southeast)
 Washington Township (south)
 Madison Township (southwest)
 Perry Township, Tippecanoe County (west)
 Sheffield Township, Tippecanoe County (west)

Major highways
  U.S. Route 421
  Indiana State Road 26
  Indiana State Road 38

Cemeteries
The township contains four cemeteries: Hiner, Kuhns, Latshaw and Pleasant View.

References
 United States Census Bureau cartographic boundary files
 U.S. Board on Geographic Names

External links

Townships in Clinton County, Indiana
Townships in Indiana
1830 establishments in Indian Territory
Populated places established in 1830